To bite the bullet ('to accept inevitable impending hardship') is a metaphorical idiom.

Bite the Bullet  may also refer to:

Arts, entertainment, and media

Music

Albums and EPs
 Bite the Bullet (EP), an EP by Black Tide
 Bite the Bullet (Hoodoo Gurus album), 1998
 Bite the Bullet (Sledgeback album)
 Bite the Bullet (Karl Wolf album), 2007

Songs
 "Bite the Bullet", a song on Alice in Chains' 1988 demo The Treehouse Tapes
 "Bite the Bullet", a song on Gillan's album Future Shock
 "Bite the Bullet", a song on Knut's album Challenger
 "Bite the Bullet", a song on Kon Kan's album Move to Move
 "Bite the Bullet", a song on Machine Head's album Through the Ashes of Empires
 "Bite the Bullet", a song on Motörhead's album Ace of Spades
 "Bite the Bullet", a song on Roadstar's album Glass Mountain

Other uses in arts, entertainment, and media
 Bite the Bullet (film), a 1975 American Western film
 Bite the Bullet, the official newsletter for the Birmingham Bullets Supporters Club
 Bite the Bullet!, a comedy production by Boom Chicago
 Bite the Bullet (video game), a 2020 video game by Mega Cat Studios

Other uses
 Bite the Bullet, a Thoroughbred horse that won the 1989 Sanford Stakes
 Bite the bullet, in philosophy, to accept unpleasant consequences of one's assumed beliefs